Rest Super is an Australian industry superannuation fund established in 1988. It is one of Australia's largest superannuation funds by membership, with around 1.9 million members in June 2022. Rest currently manages A$66 billion in funds.

Governance

Trustee
Rest Super is run by a trustee company called Retail Employees Superannuation Pty Limited, with a board of eight directors. Four directors are nominated on behalf of employees by the Shop Distributive and Allied Employees Association and four nominated on behalf of employers and employer associations.

Fund Administrator 
The fund administrator of REST is currently Australian Administration Services (AAS), a superannuation administration company based in Rhodes, New South Wales. AAS is part of the Link Group of companies. REST has worked with AAS since 1992, providing full administrative and call-centre services.

Notes

External links 
 

Australian companies established in 1988
Financial services companies established in 1988
Superannuation funds in Australia
Retailing in Australia
Retailing organizations